Möxämmädiä was a madrasa in Kazan that was attached to .

Brief history 
It was created in 1882 by Ğalimcan Barudi with the assistance of Zäynulla Räsülef and received its name in honour of Möxämmätcan Ğäilef, a merchant, at whose expense madrasa's building was constructed. The sole head of Möxämmädiä was Ğalimcan Barudi; during his absence his duties were performed by his junior brother, Ğabdraxman.

By the beginning of the 20th century, Möxämmädiä was the biggest madrasa in Idel-Ural region with about 800 shakirds (students) studying simultaneously; its educational programs and organization of the educational process was a model for many madrasas in the region. Apart from religious disciplines, there were taught Tatar and Russian languages, mathematics, geography, natural sciences, medicine, hygiene, general history, history of Tatar people and of Russia, pedagogy and other non-religious subjects.

Famous teachers and students 
 Teachers: Ğäziz Ğöbäydullin, Borhan Şäräf, Äxmätcan Mostafin, Käşşaf Tärcemani, Äbübäker Tereğulof, Säyetgäräy Alkin, Yosıf Aqçura and others.
 Fatix Ämirxan, Xuca Bädiği, Mäcit Ğafuri, Ğäliäsğar Kamal, Baqi Urmançe, Kärim Tiñçurin, Xösäyen Yamaşef, Näqi İsänbät are among Möxämmädiä's famous students.

References

External links
 

20th-century madrasas
Madrasas in the Russian Empire
Cultural heritage monuments of regional significance in Tatarstan
Religious buildings and structures in Kazan